Tito Minniti (1909 – 26 December 1935) was an Italian pilot who was killed after he was captured by Ethiopians during the Second Italo-Abyssinian War in 1935 near Degehabur. His death and alleged torture became an atrocity story proffered by the Italian government to justify their use of mustard gas against Ethiopian civilians. Minniti was posthumously decorated with the Italian Gold Medal of Valor.

Life

Tito Minniti was born in Placanica, near Reggio Calabria, Italy in 1909. He became a military pilot of the Regia Aeronautica in 1933. He had attained the rank of Lieutenant when he volunteered to fight in Ethiopia in 1935. He flew a number of missions over enemy territory.

On 26 December 1935 Minniti was flying a reconnaissance mission with an observer, Sergeant Livio Zannoni. He was forced to land behind enemy lines, probably due to engine trouble. Minnitti and Zannoni survived apparently uninjured, but were soon challenged by Ethiopians. What happened next is disputed. Both men were killed, but according to Rainer Baudendistel, "it was never established whether they died defending themselves or were killed after surrender". The only officially recorded testimony of the event, given by an Egyptian paramedic, asserted with details that Minniti was tortured and murdered by Ethiopian troops.

Italian version
According to one version of events, Minniti and Zannoni fought the Army of the Ethiopian Empire soldiers who approached. Minniti attacked them with the aircraft's machine gun, killing some of them. Eventually, he ran out of ammunition and was forced to surrender. Zannoni was killed, but Minniti was taken to the village of Bolali. Italian propaganda later declared that Minniti was subject to torture and mutilation before his death.

This version of events relied on the assertions of an attaché of the Egyptian Red Cross, Abdel Mohsein El Uisci, who later testified to the League of Nations and stated that the severed head and feet of Minniti were carried to the towns of Degehabur, Jijiga and Harar. El Uisci testified:

The leader of the killers, Manghestu, took the genitals and told El Uisci that he intended to flay Minniti's body to make cigarette paper from the skin. El Uisci, again in Dagabur, said he had also witnessed the torture of another Italian soldier, who was mutilated, impaled and then transported on a stake, which pierced a metal bar that was lying on the back of two camels.

Castration of defeated enemies was a tradition in Ethiopia as was the taking of body parts as trophies. Italy had already raised the practice at the League of Nations, as part of its justification for the invasion. Isamael Daoud, El Uisci's superior, denied the truth of his account of events. The Italians argued that Daoud was in no position to dispute the accuracy of the story, as he was in Egypt at the time.  Kamel Hamed and Labib Salamah, two other members of El Uisci's paramedic team in Ethiopia, supported El Uisci's assertions. In 1937, journalist and historian Indro Montanelli interviewed one of the Ethiopians who killed Minniti, who confirmed El Uisci's account.

Ethiopian version

The Ethiopian authorities asserted that the two Italians had been killed not by Ethiopian troops but by local people, angered by the bombing of their villages. The local Ethiopian commander Dejazmach Nasibu Emmanual sent a messenger to the Italian General Rodolfo Graziani, giving the Ethiopian version of events and assuring him that prisoners were being treated in accordance with international law. The messenger was arrested, and Graziani did not reply. Nasibu repeated the Ethiopian version in radio broadcasts.

Italian response

Graziani expressed outrage at the killing and ordered immediate bombings of Ethiopian troops. Two Red Cross camp-hospitals in the area were also hit. He even ordered leaflets to be dropped, saying: "You have beheaded one of our airmen, infringing all human and international laws, under which prisoners are sacred and deserve respect. You will get what you deserve. Graziani". The Fascist regime later argued that their use of mustard gas was legitimate because of the alleged atrocity.

After the war, the bodies of Minniti and Zannoni were found, 200 metres from the downed aircraft, but the remains were too decayed and damaged by wild animals for the manner of their death to be determined.

Aftermath

Mussolini promoted Minniti as a great Italian Royal Air Force hero. A heroic version of his last hours was circulated, according to which the plane was forced down by enemy anti-aircraft fire rather than by mechanical problems. Undaunted, the wounded Minniti still managed to land safely and hold off the Ethiopians for as long as he could, to protect his incapacitated sergeant. The citation for his award stated that he fought "a titanic and indomitable struggle. Overwhelmed by the number and ferocity of the barbarian enemy he gloriously lost his life: a shining example of high military virtues, proud spirit of sacrifice and indomitable Italian values".

Flags in Minniti's hometown were flown at half-mast. His father was quoted saying, "I have given a son to the fatherland in the World War and I do not regret giving the fatherland another. For the greatness of Italy I am ready to offer the lives of my other four!" The Reggio Calabria Airport, near his birthplace, was named after Minniti and still bears his name. The Italian sculptor Arturo Martini created a memorial entitled "Tito Minniti Hero of Africa" in 1936, depicting his headless naked body tied to a tree in cruciform pose. It is preserved in the Galleria Nazionale d'Arte Moderna in Rome.

The legitimacy of the Italian response was much debated. In 1937, the antifascist writer Giuseppe Antonio Borgese gave his own version of events, arguing that Graziani merely seized on the incident to excuse his actions:

See also
 Second Italo-Abyssinian War
 Timeline of the Second Italo-Abyssinian War

References

Sources

 
 
 
 
 

1909 births
1935 deaths
20th century in Ethiopia
Castrated people
Italian Air Force personnel
Italian aviators
Italian military personnel of the Second Italo-Ethiopian War
Italian prisoners of war
Italian torture victims
People from Reggio Calabria
Recipients of the Gold Medal of Military Valor